Erkki Väkiparta is a Finnish retired ice hockey player and bandy player. He played as a forward in the SM-sarja and SM-liiga and won two Finnish Championships.

References 

Living people
Finnish ice hockey players
Year of birth missing (living people)